Sir Andrew Hunter Arbuthnot Murray  (19 December 1903 – 21 March 1977) was Lord Provost of Edinburgh, Scotland between 1947 and 1951, Lord Lieutenant of the City of Edinburgh, and a Justice of the Peace.

The son of Alfred Alexander Arbuthnot Murray and Bethany (née Moir), Murray was educated Daniel Stewart's College and George Heriot's School. He was elected a City Councillor of Edinburgh in 1929, and served as Hon. City Treasurer 1943–46. He was President of the Scottish Liberal Party Organisation 1961–65.

He was also an Honorary Colonel of the 52nd (Queens Edinburgh Royal Scots) Searchlight, of the 130th Light Anti-Aircraft and of the 587th Light Anti-Aircraft Regiment, Royal Artillery.

Murray was awarded the OBE in 1945, and knighted on 25 February 1949 to become Sir Sir Andrew Murray. He was appointed Commander of the Venerable Order of Saint John, 24 June 1949, and a Knight of St John in 1954. He was Chancellor of the Priory of Scotland and Preceptor of Torphichen.

In 1950, he received an honorary doctorate of law from the University of Edinburgh. On 23 January 1953 he was appointed Deputy Lieutenant of Edinburgh. He was chairman of the board of trustees of the Scottish National War Memorial at The Castle, Edinburgh, and author of The Scottish National War Memorial: The Castle Edinburgh.

See also
List of Lords Provost of Edinburgh

References
 Adams, T., Harvey, Wm., & Whitson, T. (editors), Edinburgh 1329 - 1929, Edinburgh, 1929, p. 140, where it is clearly stated that in the year 1794 the Sovereign was graciously pleased to constitute the Lord Provost of Edinburgh and his successors in office Lords Lieutenant of the County of the City and Liberties of Edinburgh, and has the power of raising the lieges in arms, of appointing Deputy Lieutenants, and of exercising all other powers and prerogatives of Lords Lieutenant.
MURRAY, Sir Andrew (Hunter Arbuthnot), Who Was Who, A & C Black, 1920–2016 (online edition, Oxford University Press, 2014)

1903 births
1977 deaths
Scottish knights
Scottish justices of the peace
Lord Provosts of Edinburgh
Officers of the Order of the British Empire
Knights Bachelor
Knights of the Order of St John
People educated at Stewart's Melville College
People educated at George Heriot's School
Politicians awarded knighthoods
Councillors in Edinburgh
Presidents of the Liberal Party (UK)
Scottish Liberal Party politicians
Politicians from Edinburgh
20th-century British Army personnel
Royal Artillery officers